Narcissus papyraceus (from papyrus and aceus; meaning paper-like), one of a few species known as paperwhite, is a perennial bulbous plant native to the Mediterranean region, from Greece to Portugal plus Morocco and Algeria. The species is considered naturalized in the Azores, Corsica, Texas, California and Louisiana. The white flowers are borne in bunches and are strongly fragrant. It is frequently grown as a house plant, often forced to flower at Christmas.

Paperwhites are part of the genus Narcissus which includes plants known as daffodils.

Description
The stems are mid-green and grow upright. Mature height is usually 1–1.5 ft (30–45 cm), though this varies by variety. Several white flowers are borne at the top of each stem and are strongly scented.

Cultivation
Many cultivars are available and are easy to force into bloom indoors. Unlike other Narcissus species, paperwhites do not require chilling to promote bloom. The bulbs begin to grow as soon as they are planted, with flowers appearing in 3–4 weeks.

Narcissus papyraceus thrives in moist, peat moss based potting mix. Plants can also be grown in containers of water.

Gallery

References

External links
Paperwhite Cultivation Information

papyraceus
Garden plants
Flora of Morocco
Flora of Algeria
Flora of the Azores
Flora of Corsica
Flora of Portugal
Flora of Sicily
Flora of Spain
Flora of Italy
Flora of France
Flora of Greece
Plants described in 1806